Virginia Women in History was an annual program sponsored by the Library of Virginia that honored Virginia women, living and dead, for their contributions to their community, region, state, and nation. The program began in 2000 under the aegis of the Virginia Foundation for Women and Delta Kappa Gamma Society International; from 2006  to 2020 it was administered by the Library of Virginia. In 2021, it was replaced by the Strong Men and Women in Virginia History program.

2000 honorees 

 Ella Graham Agnew (1871–1958), Blacksburg, educator and social worker
 Mary Julia Baldwin (1829–1897), Staunton, educator
 Margaret Brent (c. 1601 – c. 1671), Stafford County, planter
 Willa Cather (1873–1947), Frederick County, writer
 Jennie Dean (1848–1913), Manassas, educator
 Sarah Lee Fain (1888–1962), Norfolk, legislator
 Ellen Glasgow (1873–1945), Richmond, author
 Dolley Madison (1768–1849), Orange County, First Lady
 Pocahontas (c. 1596–1617), Jamestown
 Clementina Rind (c. 1740–1774), Williamsburg, printer
 Lila Meade Valentine (1865–1921), Richmond, reformer and suffragist
 Maggie Lena Walker (1864–1934), Richmond, entrepreneur and civil rights leader

2001 honorees 

 Rosa Dixon Bowser (1855–1931), Richmond, educator and civic leader
 Elizabeth Pfohl Campbell (1902–2004), Arlington, public television pioneer
 Thomasina Jordan (1940–1999), Alexandria, American Indian advocate
 Elizabeth Hobbs Keckly (1818–1907), Dinwiddie County, seamstress and author
 Theresa Pollak (1899–2002), Richmond, artist and educator
 Sally Louisa Tompkins (1833–1916), Richmond, hospital administrator
 Elizabeth Van Lew (1818–1900), Richmond, spy
 Edith Bolling Galt Wilson (1872–1961), Wytheville, First Lady

2002 honorees 

 Rebecca Adamson (born 1950), Fredericksburg, Native American advocate and business developer
 Janie Porter Barrett (1865–1948), Hanover County, educator
 Patsy Cline (1932–1963), Winchester, singer
 Hannah Lee Corbin (1728–1782), Westmoreland County, planter
 Christine Mann Darden (born 1942), Hampton, engineer
 Lillian Ward McDaniel (1902–1981), Richmond, educator and civic leader
 Mary-Cooke Branch Munford (1865–1938), Richmond, social reformer and community activist
 Jessie Manfield Rattley (1929–2001), Newport News, mayor and social activist

2003 honorees 

 Nancy Langhorne Astor (1879–1964), Albemarle County, member of Parliament
 Pearl Bailey (1918–1990), Newport News, singer and actor
 Anna Whitehead Bodeker (1826–1904), Richmond, woman suffrage advocate
 Mary Ann Elliott (born 1943), Fairfax County, entrepreneur
 Annabelle Ravenscroft Gibson Jenkins (1827–1901), Richmond, philanthropist 
 Frances Benjamin Johnston (1864–1952), Fredericksburg, photographer
 Anne Dobie Peebles (1922–2012), Sussex County, civic leader
 Anne B. Spencer (1882–1975), Lynchburg, poet

2004 honorees 

 Grace Arents (1848–1926), Richmond, philanthropist
 Cockacoeske (fl. 1656–1686), Middle Peninsula, Pamunkey chief
 Katie Couric (born 1957), Arlington County, television journalist
 Ann Makemie Holden (1702–1788), Accomack County, planter
 Mary Draper Ingles (1732–1815), New River Valley, frontierswoman
 Sarah Garland Boyd Jones (1866–1905), Richmond, physician
 Elizabeth "Annie" Snyder (1921–2002), Manassas, preservationist
 Martha Dandridge Custis Washington (1731–1802), Fairfax County, First Lady

2005 honorees 

 Clara Leach Adams-Ender (born 1939), Prince William County, chief of the United States Army Nurse Corps
 Caitlyn Day (born 1986), Craig County, community activist
 Bessie Blount Griffin (1914–2009), Princess Anne County, inventor and forensic scientist
 Nora Houston (1883–1942), Richmond, artist and social reformer
 Barbara Johns (1935–1991), Prince Edward County, Civil Rights activist
 Mary Johnston (1870–1936), Bath County, writer and suffragist
 Lee Marshall Smith (born 1944), Roanoke, writer
 Mary Belvin Wade (1951–2003), Richmond, civic leader

2006 honorees 

 Katherine Harwood Waller Barrett (1865–1948), Henrico County, physician and educator
 Sister Marie Majella Berg (1916–2004), Arlington County, president of Marymount University
 John-Geline MacDonald Bowman (1890–1946), Richmond, business executive
 Grace Brewster Murray Hopper (1906–1992), Arlington County, computer scientist and rear admiral
 Mary Tyler Freeman Cheek McClenahan (1917–2005), Richmond, civic leader
 Benita Fitzgerald Mosley (born 1961), Haymarket, media executive and Olympic gold medalist
 G. Anne Nelson Richardson (born 1956), King and Queen County, Rappahannock chief
 Mary Virginia Hawes Terhune (1830–1922), Amelia County, writer

2007 honorees
 Mary Willing Byrd (1740–1814), Charles City County, planter
 Maybelle Addington Carter (1909–1978), Scott County, singer
 Laura Lu Scherer Copenhaver (1868–1940), Smyth County, founder of Rosemont Industries and Lutheran lay leader
 Mary Alice Franklin Hatwood Futrell (born 1940), Lynchburg, educator
 Mary Jeffery Galt (1844–1922), Norfolk, preservationist
 Sheila Crump Johnson (born 1949), Loudoun County, founder of Black Entertainment Television (BET) and sports franchise owner
 Opossunoquonuske (fl. 1607–1610), Chesterfield County, Appamattuck leader
 Camilla Williams (1919–2012), Danville, opera singer

2008 honorees
 Frances Culpeper Berkeley (baptized 27 May 1634–c. 1695), James City County, leader of the Green Spring faction
 Lucy Goode Brooks (1818–1900), Richmond, founder of the Friends' Asylum for Colored Orphans
 Providencia Velazquez Gonzalez (1917–2013), Dale City, community activist
 Elizabeth Bermingham Lacy (born 1945), Richmond, judge of the Supreme Court of Virginia
 Sharyn McCrumb (born 1948), Roanoke County, writer
 Patricia Buckley Moss (born 1933), Waynesboro, artist and philanthropist
 Isabel Wood Rogers (1924–2007), Richmond, moderator, General Assembly of the Presbyterian Church (USA)
 Edith Turner (Wané Roonseraw) (c. 1754–1838), Southampton County, chief of the Nottoway (Cheroenhaka)

2009 honorees
 Pauline Adams (1874–1957), Norfolk, suffragist
 Caroline Bradby Cook (c. 1839 – after 1910), King William County, Pamunkey leader and Unionist
 Claudia Emerson (1957–2014), Fredericksburg, poet
 Drew Gilpin Faust (born 1947), Clarke County, historian and president of Harvard University
 Joann Hess Grayson (born 1948), Harrisonburg, educator and advocate for abused children
 Mary Randolph (1762–1828), Chesterfield County and Richmond, writer
 Virginia Estelle Randolph (1874–1958), Henrico County, educator
 Mary Sue Terry (born 1947), Patrick County, attorney general

2010 honorees
  Mollie Holmes Adams (1881–1973), King William County, Upper Mattaponi leader
 Ethel Bailey Furman (1893–1976), Richmond, architect
 Edythe C. Harrison (born 1934), Norfolk, civic leader
 Janis Martin (1940–2007), Danville, singer and composer
 Kate Mason Rowland (1840–1916), Richmond, writer
 Jean Miller Skipwith (1748–1826), Mecklenburg County, book collector
 Queena Stovall (1888–1980), Lynchburg and Amherst County, artist
 Marian A. Van Landingham (born 1937), Alexandria, civic leader

2011 honorees
Lucy Addison (1861–1937), Roanoke, educator
Eleanor Bontecou (1891–1976), Arlington County, attorney
Emily White Fleming (1855–1941), Fredericksburg, preservationist
Pearl Fu (born 1941), Roanoke, civic leader
Lillian Lincoln Lambert (born 1940), Mechanicsville, businesswoman and author
Bessie Niemeyer Marshall (1884–1960), Petersburg, botanical illustrator
Felicia Warburg Rogan (born 1927), Albemarle County, vintner
Elizabeth Henry Campbell Russell (1749–1825), Saltville, Methodist lay leader

2012 honorees

Susie May Ames (1888–1969), Accomack County, historian
Monica Beltran (born 1985), Woodbridge, army Bronze Star Medal recipient
Christiana Burdett Campbell (c. 1723–1792), Williamsburg, innkeeper
Betty Sams Christian (1922–2006), Richmond, business executive and philanthropist
Elizabeth Peet McIntosh (1915–2015), Woodbridge, intelligence agent
Orleana Hawks Puckett (died 1939), Patrick and Carroll Counties, midwife
Judith Shatin (born 1949), Charlottesville, composer
Alice Jackson Stuart (1913–2001), Richmond, principal in a 1935 civil rights turning point

2013 honorees
 Mary C. Alexander (1893–1955), Lynchburg, aviator
 Louise A. Reeves Archer (1893–1948), Vienna, educator
 Elizabeth Ambler Brent Carrington (1765–1842), Richmond, civic leader
 Ann Compton (born 1947), Roanoke, news correspondent
 JoAnn Falleta (born 1954), Norfolk, musician
 Cleo Powell (born 1957), Brunswick County, judge
 Inez Pruitt (born 1962), Tangier Island, physician assistant
 Eva Mae Fleming Scott (1926–2019), Amelia County, legislator, recipient of the VABPW Foundation Business Leadership Award

2014 honorees
 Mary Berkeley Minor Blackford (1802–1896), Fredericksburg, antislavery activist
 Naomi Silverman Cohn (1888–1982), Richmond, civic activist
 Elizabeth Ashburn Duke (born 1952), Virginia Beach, banker, recipient of the VABPW Foundation Business Leadership Award
 Rachel Findlay (c. 1750–d. after August 17, 1820), Wythe County, principal in a freedom suit
 Christine Herter Kendall (1890–1981), Bath County, artist and patron of the arts
 Mildred Delores Jeter Loving (1939–2008), Caroline County, principal in a 1967 civil rights turning point
 Deborah A. "Debbie" Ryan (born 1952), Albemarle County, basketball coach and cancer treatment advocate
 Stoner Winslett (born 1958), Richmond, artistic director and choreographer

2015 honorees
 Nancy Melvina Caldwell (1868–1956), Carroll County, legislator
 Nikki Giovanni (born 1943), Blacksburg, poet
 Ruth Coles Harris (born 1928), Richmond, business professor
 Dorothy Shoemaker McDiarmid (1906–1994), Fairfax County, legislator
 Rebekah Dulaney Peterkin (1849–1891), Richmond, philanthropist
 Vivian W. Pinn (born 1941), Lynchburg, pathologist and women's health advocate
 Elizabeth Bray Allen, also known as Elizabeth Bray Allen Smith Stith (c. 1692–1774), Isle of Wight County, planter and philanthropist
 Karenne Wood (1960–2019), Fluvanna County, Virginia Indian scholar and advocate

2016 honorees
Flora D. Crittenden (1924–2021), Newport News, educator and legislator
Mary Elizabeth Nottingham Day (1907–1956), Staunton, artist
Sarah A. Gray (c. 1847–1893), Alexandria, educator
Edwilda Gustava Allen Isaac (1937–2022), Farmville, civil rights pioneer
Katherine Coleman Goble Johnson (1918–2020), Hampton, mathematician
Ana Ines Barragan King (born 1957), Richmond, founder and Artistic Director of the Latin Ballet of Virginia
Betty Masters (1929–2015), Salem, photojournalist
Meyera Oberndorf (1941–2015), Virginia Beach, mayor

2017 honorees
Corazon Sandoval Foley (born 1950), Fairfax County, community activist
Nora Houston (1883–1942), Richmond, artist and social reformer
Cynthia Eppes Hudson (born 1959), Nottoway County, Chief Deputy Attorney General of Virginia
Mary Virginia Jones (born 1940), Prince William County, mechanical engineer
Louise Harrison McCraw(1893–1975), Buckingham, author and executive secretary of the Braille Circulating Library
Doris Crouse-Mays (born 1958), Wythe County, labor leader
Undine Smith Moore (1904–1989), Ettrick, educator and composer
Martha Rollins (born 1943), Richmond, community activist and philanthropist; recipient of the VABPW Foundation Business Leadership Award

2018 honorees
 Gaye Todd Adegbalola (born 1944), blues singer and guitarist, teacher, lecturer, activist, and photographer
 Rita Dove (born 1952), poet and essayist
 Isabella Gibbons (d. 1890), teacher and minister
 Marii Kyogoku Hasegawa (1918–2012), peace activist
 Kay Coles James (born 1949), president of the Heritage Foundation
 Barbara Kingsolver (born 1955), novelist
 Mary Aydelotte Rice Marshall  (1921–1992), Virginia House of Delegates
 Temperance Flowerdew Yeardley (d. 1628), settler of the Jamestown Colony

2019 honorees
Sharifa Alkhateeb (1946–2004) Muslim writer and teacher
Queen Ann (Pamunkey chief) (fl. 1706–1712)
Claudia Lane Dodson (1941–2007), women's sports advocate
India Hamilton (c. 1879 – 1950), educator
Georgeanna Seegar Jones (1912–2005), American physician who with her husband, Howard W. Jones, pioneered in vitro fertilization in the United States 
Ona Maria Judge (c. 1773 – 1848), Fugitive slave of US President George Washington, who successfully escaped Mount Vernon. The Washington family never pursued her, but never freed her. 
Lucy Randolph Mason (1882–1959), civil rights activist, labor activist and suffragette
Kate Peters Sturgill (1907–1975), musician and folk song collector

2020 honorees
 Pauline Adams (1874–1957), suffragist
 Fannie Bayly King (1864–1951), social reformer and suffragist
 Elizabeth Dabney Langhorne Lewis (1851–1946), suffragist
 Sophie G. Meredith (1851–1928), suffragist
 Josephine Mathes Norcom (1873–1927), community activist and suffragist
 Mary Elizabeth Pidgeon (1890–1979), suffragist and labor economist
 Ora Brown Stokes (1882–1957), educator, probation officer, temperance worker, and clubwoman
Lila Meade Valentine (1865–1921), reformer and suffragist
Maggie Lena Mitchell Walker (1864–1934), entrepreneur and civil rights leader

References

External links
 Virginia Women in History

History of Virginia
Women in Virginia
Women's halls of fame
Awards established in 2000
2000 establishments in Virginia
History of women in Virginia